"The Dragon" is a short story by American writer Ray Bradbury, originally published in 1955 in the magazine Esquire.  A limited edition (352 copies, signed and numbered or lettered) of the story was published by Footsteps Press in 1988.
It appears in A Medicine for Melancholy (1959), R is for Rocket (1962), Classic Stories 1 (1990), and Bradbury Stories (2003).

Plot
The story concerns two knights who have a mission to slay a dragon. They describe the dragon as huge, fire-breathing, and horrific, having only one eye. They charge the dragon but fail, presumably dying in the attempt.

The "dragon" is then revealed to be a steam train, and its single eye is the train's headlight. The operators discuss the encounter but continue on without attempting to find the knights.

Sources

External links
 

1955 short stories
1988 books
Fantasy short stories
Short stories by Ray Bradbury
Works originally published in Esquire (magazine)
Trains in fiction